This is a list of notable record labels based in Atlanta, Georgia

1017 Brick Squad 
Brick Squad Monopoly
Arista Records—Parent company of LaFace Records, which has set up a satellite office in Atlanta.
BME Recordings—Record Label owned by Rapper Lil Jon
Block Entertainment
Daemon Records
Disturbing Tha Peace - Record Label owned by rapper Ludacris
Dust-to-Digital - Roots and archival label
Freebandz
Edition Lilac—Early Music and Classical Record Label
Grand Hustle Records-Record label owned by rapper T.I.
Konvict Muzik
LaFace Records
LoveRenaissance
Quality Control Music
RBMG
Reach Records-Record label owned by Rapper Lecrae
Rob's House Records
Shonuff Records
So So Def Records
This Is American Music—Southeastern Independent Label headquartered in Atlanta

Culture of Atlanta